Edward Stanley Angel (born January 6, 1944) is an emeritus professor of computer science at the University of New Mexico. He has published numerous books and journal articles including many successful titles on OpenGL.

References

University of New Mexico faculty
1944 births
Living people